Bcl-2-like protein 12 is a protein that in humans is encoded by the BCL2L12 gene.

The protein encoded by this gene belongs to the Bcl-2 protein family. Bcl-2 family members form hetero- or homodimers and act as anti- or pro-apoptotic regulators that are involved in a wide variety of cellular activities. This protein contains a Bcl-2 homology domain 2 (BH2). The function of this gene has not yet been determined. Two alternatively spliced transcript variants of this gene encoding distinct isoforms have been reported.

Bcl2L12 expression is upregulated in most human glioblastomas. Expression of Bcl2L12 results in resistance to apoptosis. Bcl2L12 directly neutralizes caspase-7 (CASP7) and indirectly neutralizes caspase-3 (CASP3) by an indirect mechanism. Both caspase enzymes are known to play essential roles in the execution phase of apoptosis.

References

External links

Further reading